This is a list of historical African place names. The names on the left are linked to the corresponding subregion(s) from History of Africa.
 Axum - Eritrea and Ethiopia  
Mauritania Tingitana-Morocco
 Africa (province) - Tunisia
 Barbary Coast - Algeria
 Bechuanaland - Botswana
 Belgian Congo - Democratic Republic of the Congo
 Carthage - Tunisia
 Central African Empire - Central African Republic
 Congo Free State - Democratic Republic of the Congo
 Dahomey - Benin
 Equatoria - Sudan and Uganda
 Fernando Pó - Bioko
 French Congo - Gabon and Republic of the Congo
 French Equatorial Africa - Chad, Central African Republic, Gabon, Republic of the Congo
 French Sudan - Mali
 French West Africa - Mauritania, Senegal, Mali, Guinea, Ivory Coast, Niger, Burkina Faso, and Benin
 German East Africa - Tanzania and Zanzibar
 German South-West Africa - Namibia
 The Gold Coast - Ghana
 Guinea
 Grain Coast or Pepper Coast - Liberia
 Malagasy Republic - Madagascar
 Mdre Bahri -Eritrea
 Monomotapa - Zimbabwe, South Africa, Lesotho, Swaziland, Mozambique and parts of Namibia and Botswana
 Middle Congo - Republic of the Congo
 Nubia - Sudan and Egypt
 Numidia - Algeria, Libya and Tunisia
 Nyasaland - Malawi
 Western Pentapolis - Libya
 Portuguese Guinea - Guinea-Bissau
 Rhodesia -
Northern Rhodesia - Zambia
Southern Rhodesia - Zimbabwe
(Southern Rhodesia was commonly referred to simply as Rhodesia from 1964 to 1980)
 Rwanda-Urundi - Rwanda and Burundi
 The Slave Coast - Benin
 Somaliland - Somalia
 South-West Africa - Namibia
 Spanish Sahara - Western Sahara
 Swaziland - Eswatini
 French Upper Volta - Republic of Upper Volta - Burkina Faso
 Zaire - Republic of the Congo - Democratic Republic of the Congo

See also
 List of former sovereign states

Africa-related lists
History of Africa
Names of places in Africa